Downsview is a neighbourhood in Toronto, Canada

Downsview may also refer to:

 Downsview Park station, a Toronto Transit Commission subway station opened in 2017
 Downsview Airport, a testing facility for Bombardier Aerospace
 Downsview Park, a federal park in the Downsview neighbourhood of Toronto, Canada
 Sheppard West station, a Toronto Transit Commission subway station formerly called Downsview station